On June 5–6, 1916, a deadly severe-weather episode produced at least 35 tornadoes across the Southern United States on June 5–6, 1916. The outbreak killed at least 112 people, 76 of them in the U.S. state of Arkansas alone. Unconfirmed reports suggested higher totals in rural areas. The outbreak was the deadliest June tornado outbreak in the state and one of the largest outbreaks in Arkansas history, with at least 24 significant tornadoes in-state. The deadliest tornado of the outbreak and the deadliest to strike Arkansas on June 5 was a powerful F4 tornado that hit Heber Springs, killing 25 people. Other deadly tornadoes struck much of the state and in nearby parts of Missouri and Illinois. Overnight on June 5–6, tornadoes spread east and south into Louisiana, Tennessee, and Mississippi, with an F3 tornado hitting the northern suburbs of Jackson, Mississippi, killing 13 people there.

Confirmed tornadoes

June 5 event

June 6 event

See also
List of North American tornadoes and tornado outbreaks

Notes

References

External links

F4 tornadoes by date
 ,1916-06-05
Tornadoes of 1916
Tornadoes in Arkansas
Tornadoes in Missouri
Tornadoes in Mississippi
Tornadoes in Alabama
1916 in Arkansas
June 1916 events